is the ninth studio album by Japanese singer-songwriter Miyuki Nakajima, released in March 1982.

Five months before the album came out, she produced a hit single "Bad Girl (Akujo)", which became her first chart topper since "Wakareuta (The Parting Song)" in 1977. The song became one of the most commercially successful single of that year, reaching the top-10 on the year-end chart of 1982. In the following year, Sylvie Vartan covered the song in French-translated lyrics on her Danse ta vie album, under the alternative title "Ta vie de chien".

Kansuigyo begin with another interpretation of above-mentioned successful song, which features more rock-oriented arrangement and her listless vocals. Rest of the album mainly consists of the ballads that used strings effectively . "Utahime (Diva)", 8-minute-long track included at the end of the album has been one of her fan favorites and also included on her later "greatest hits". Lyrics of "Keisha (The Incline)", the song which described melancholy of a solitary elderly woman who are walking on steep slope, was evaluated literarily and had been listed in a textbook on the Japanese language around the 1990s. When Nakajima recorded the Ima no Kimochi album that were constituted by new interpretations of the past materials in 2004, those two songs were picked out from Kansuigyo.

The album spent the number-one spot on the Japanese Oricon chart for six-week, and became the country's best-selling LP of that year. It has also been her album that gained biggest commercial success to date, eventually selling about 770,000 units.

Track listing
All songs written and composed by Miyuki Nakajima.

Side one
All songs arranged by Nozomi Aoki (except "Bad Girl" and "The Incline" arranged by Tsugutoshi Goto) 
""[Album Version] – 5:12
"" – 6:00
"" – 5:19
"" – 6:41

Side two
All songs arranged by Nozomi Aoki (except "B.G.M." arranged by Masataka Matsutoya)
 "B.G.M." – 3:51
"" – 3:58
"" – 5:30
"" – 3:53
"" – 8:12

Personnel

Band
 Miyuki Nakajima – vocals
 Masaki Matsubara – electric guitar
 Tsuyoshi Kon – electric guitar
 Fujimal Yoshino – electric guitar, acoustic guitar
 Chuei Yoshikawa – acoustic guitar
 Toishiaki Usui – acoustic guitar
 Nobuo Kurata – keyboards
 Hiroshi Shibui – keyboards
 Masataka Matsutoya – keyboards
 Tsugutoshi Goto – bass guitar
 Yasuo Tomikura – bass guitar
 Kenji Takamizu – bass guitar
 Akira Okazawa – bass guitar
 Michio Nagaoka – bass guitar
 Nobu Saito – percussion
 Minoru Ishiyama – percussion
 Motoya Hamaguchi – percussion
 Naoki Yamamoto – percussion
 Tatsuo Hayashi – drums
 Jun Morikawa – drums
 Yuichi Tokashiki – drums
 Hideo Yamaki – drums

Additional personnel
 Fujisawa Group – strings
 Tomato Strings Unsemble – strings
  Tomoda etc. – strings
 Yasuo Mito etc. – sStrings
 Isao Kaneyama – malimba, vibra glocken
 Masakazu Ishibashi – oboe
 Sakae Yamada etc. – horns
 Yasuo Hirauchi- trombone
 Isamu Mita- trombone
 Sumio Okada – trombone
 Eiji Arai – trombone
 Shuhei Hisayasu – tuba
 Keiko Yamakawa – harp
 Mikiko Imamichi – harp

Production
 Composer, writer, Producer and Performer: Miyuki Nakajima
 Arranger:Nozomi Aoki, Tsugutoshi Gotoh, Masataka Matsutoya
 Remix Engineer: Shozo Inomata
 Photographer and Art Director: Jin Tamura
 Designer: Hirofumi Arai
 Costume: Kazumi Yamase
 Artist Management: Hiroshi Kojima, Kunio Kaneko
 General Producer: Genichi Kawakami
 Special Thanks to Satoru Ide, Kaname Terazaki, Gil House People

Awards

Chart positions

Release history

References

Miyuki Nakajima albums
1982 albums
Pony Canyon albums